The 2014 AFC Challenge Cup was the fifth and the final edition of the AFC Challenge Cup, an international football competition for Asian Football Confederation (AFC) member nations that are mainly categorized as "emerging countries" in the now defunct Vision Asia programme. It took place from 19 to 30 May 2014. The winner, Palestine, qualified to the 2015 AFC Asian Cup.

Hosts 
The AFC decided that an automatic qualification place will be given to the tournament's hosts starting from this edition.  Four countries then expressed interest in bidding to host the tournament; India, Maldives, Philippines, and Tajikistan. The AFC announced on 13 November 2012 that the Philippines and Maldives were in the final shortlist to host the Finals. The final decision was taken in the AFC Competitions Committee meeting on 28 November 2012, and the hosting rights were given to the Maldives.  The Maldives Ministry of Youth and Sports then claimed that they wanted to host the tournament due to the poor facilities they encountered in the 2012 AFC Challenge Cup which the Maldives qualified and competed in.

In mid-November 2013, AFC president Salman Bin Ibrahim Al-Khalifa announced that the Philippines would be the backup hosts "if something goes wrong in Maldives."  By 25 November, the AFC proposed - pending the approval of the Executive Committee - to move the tournament from the Maldives to the Philippines if the Maldives do not start the required renovation work by 15 December 2013.  The AFC then inspected possible venues in Manila and the Philippine Football Federation claimed that they would be ready to host the tournament if given the nod.  Despite this, the Maldives' Ministry of Youth and Sports said they would do everything necessary for the country to host the tournament. On 7 January 2014, the AFC announced that the Maldives would remain as the host of the 2014 AFC Challenge Cup.

Venues
After the Maldives were given the hosting rights of the tournament, the Maldives' Ministry of Youth and Sports stated that the listed venues below would be used but renovations would be required. Renovations then started in mid-January 2014 and was expected to be completed within 90 days. In a function on 12 May, the National Stadium was handed over to the Ministry of Youth and Sports and opened by President Abdulla Yameen. The stadium was also re-branded as the 'National Football Stadium'. Another function six days later at the second venue, originally known as the Hithadhoo Zone Stadium, was handed over and inaugurated by former President Maumoon Abdul Gayoom. It was also re-branded as the 'Addu Footbal Stadium'.

Qualification

The qualification draw was held on 11 December 2012 in AFC House in Kuala Lumpur, Malaysia. The twenty teams involved in the qualification draw were drawn into five groups of four teams. The five group winners plus the two best second-placed teams qualified for the finals.  North Korea, the 2010 and 2012 champions, were excluded from participating in the 2014 AFC Challenge Cup.

Qualified nations

Draw
The eight participating teams were drawn into two brackets of the group stage. To prepare for this, the teams were separated into four pots of two teams each based on their performance in the 2012 edition of the tournament with the exception of hosts being placed in Pot 1.  The final draw was held at the Paradise Island Resort in the Maldives on 12 February 2014.

Squads

Each team can name a squad of 23 players.

Group stage

Tie-breaking criteria
The teams are ranked according to points (3 points for a win, 1 point for a tie, 0 points for a loss) and tie breakers are in following order:
Greater number of points obtained in the group matches between the teams concerned;
Goal difference resulting from the group matches between the teams concerned;
Greater number of goals scored in the group matches between the teams concerned;
Goal difference in all the group matches;
Greater number of goals scored in all the group matches;
Kicks from the penalty mark if only two teams are involved and they are both on the field of play;
Fewer score calculated according to the number of yellow and red cards received in the group matches; (1 point for each yellow card, 3 points for each red card as a consequence of two yellow cards, 3 points for each direct red card, 4 points for each yellow card followed by a direct red card)
Drawing of lots.

All times UTC+5.

Group A

Group B

Knockout stage

Semi-finals

Third place play-off

Final

Statistics

Winner

Player awards
Top goalscorer:  Ashraf Nu'man
Most Valuable Player:  Murad Ismail

Goalscorers 
4 goals
 Ashraf Nu'man

3 goals
 Ali Ashfaq

2 goals

 Mohammad Umair
 Kyaw Ko Ko
 Abdelhamid Abuhabib
 Patrick Reichelt
 Phil Younghusband
 Didar Durdyýew

1 goal

 Zohib Islam Amiri
 Ahmad Hatifi
 Hamidullah Karimi
 Faysal Shayesteh
 Vladimir Verevkin
 Khampheng Sayavutthi
 Assadhulla Abdulla
 Ali Fasir
 Nyein Chan Aung
 Chris Greatwich
 Jerry Lucena
 Simone Rota
 Döwlet Baýramow
 Bahtiýar Hojaahmedow
 Süleýman Muhadow

Own goal
 Vathana Keodouangdeth (playing against Turkmenistan)

Team statistics
This table shows all team performance. Matches that ended in a penalty shoot out are counted as draws

Notes

References

External links
AFC Challenge Cup, the-AFC.com

 
2014
2014 in Asian football
2014
2013–14 in Palestinian football
2014 in Burmese football
2014 in Laotian football
2014 in Afghan football
2014 in Philippine football
2014 in Kyrgyzstani football
2014 in Maldivian football
2014 in Turkmenistani football
May 2014 sports events in Asia